Wayne Hildred (born 12 September 1955) is a New Zealand former racing cyclist. He won the Australian national road race title in 1982 and 1986. Although he raced predominantly in Australia he rode as a New Zealander in all races he entered. After a break of 19 years Hildred raced the New Zealand masters Championships where he finished first. Then in 2016 he did the same in Australia winning their masters championship.

Major results
Sources:
1980
 4th Overall Herald Sun Tour
1982 
 1st  Road race, Australian National Road Championships
 1st Stage 7 Herald Sun Tour
 3rd Omloop van de Vlaamse Scheldeboorden
 9th GP Frans Melckenbeek
1983
 1st Stage 13 Herald Sun Tour
1986 
 1st  Road race, Australian National Road Championships
1987
 2nd Road race, Australian National Road Championships
 8th Overall Herald Sun Tour

References

External links
 

1955 births
Living people
Australian male cyclists
Place of birth missing (living people)